Yoseph "Yossi" Zana (born 15 July 1957) is a former Israeli professional association football player and former international.

Biography

Playing career

International 
Zana made his full national team debut on 20 November 1983 in a match against West Germany at Bloomfield Stadium.

Personal life 
Zana was born to a Tunisian-Jewish family. He is married to Aliza and was last known to be working for the Israel Electric Corporation.

Honours 
 With Maccabi Netanya:
 Liga Leumit (1): 1977/78
With Beitar Jerusalem:
 Israel State Cup (1): 1978/79
 With Hapoel Tel Aviv:
 Liga Leumit (3): 1980/81, 1985/86, 1987/88
Israel State Cup (1): 1982/83
 UEFA Intertoto Cup group 8 winner (1): 1978
 With Bnei Yehuda Tel Aviv:
 Liga Leumit (1): 1989/90

References

General references
 
 
 

1957 births
Living people
Israeli footballers
Maccabi Netanya F.C. players
Beitar Jerusalem F.C. players
Hapoel Tel Aviv F.C. players
Bnei Yehuda Tel Aviv F.C. players
Maccabi Yavne F.C. players
Israel international footballers
Liga Leumit players
Footballers from Hadera
Israeli people of Tunisian-Jewish descent
Association football defenders